"Right or Wrong" is a jazz ballad from 1921. Composed by Arthur Sizemore and Paul Biese, with words by Haven Gillespie, it is described by the original sheet music as "a beautiful fox-trot ballad."

The lyrics tell of the loss of a paramour. The title comes from a refrain in the chorus:

Recordings
"Right or Wrong" was recorded by many early jazz and swing orchestras, including Mike Markel and His Orchestra (OKeh 4478, 1921), Original Dixie Jazz Band (Oriole 445, 1925), Peggy English (Brunswick 3949, 1928), Tampa Red (Bluebird 6832, 1936). The recording with the longest lasting influence was performed by the black-faced Emmett Miller and the Georgia Crackers (OKeh 41280, 1929).

Miller's version was picked up by an early Bob Wills and became a standard Western swing dance tune. Both Wills (Vocalion 03451, 1936) and Milton Brown (Decca 5342, 1936) made early recordings. Western swing versions generally do not include any of the verses, only repetitions of the chorus. The song also appears on Leon Redbone's 1990 album Sugar.

The 1937 popular song by Mildred Bailey and Her Orchestra (Vocalion 3758) is a different song, having been written by Victor Schertzinger for the film Something to Sing About.

Wanda Jackson's hit "Right or Wrong" in 1961 is not this song, but one written by herself.

George Strait version

The biggest hit for "Right or Wrong" came on April 28, 1984, when George Strait recorded the old Bob Wills song for his best-selling album of the same name (See Right or Wrong). The single from that album (MCA 52337) reached #1, staying on the charts for 12 weeks.

George Strait's success led to the songwriter, Haven Gillespie, receiving an ASCAP award in 1985 for writing the song.

Charts

Weekly charts

Year-end charts

References

Bibliography 
 Gillespie, Haven (w.); Arthur Sizemore and Paul Biese (m.) "Right or Wrong". Triangle Music, 1921. From Indiana University Sheet Music Collections.
 King, Charles D. "Gillespie, James Haven Lamont" from The Kentucky Encyclopedia, pp. 374–375, edited by John E. Kleber, Thomas D. Clark, Lowell H. Harrison and James C. Klotter.
 Stambler, Irwin; Grelun Landon. Country Music: The Encyclopedia. St. Martin's Griffin, 2000. 
 Whitburn, Joel. The Billboard Book of Top 40 Country Hits. Billboard Books, 2006. 

Western swing songs
1921 songs
1984 singles
George Strait songs
Songs with lyrics by Haven Gillespie
Song recordings produced by Ray Baker (music producer)
MCA Records singles